The Williamsport Grays were a minor league baseball team in Williamsport, Pennsylvania between 1923 and 1962. The club began play in 1923 in the New York–Pennsylvania League and were a charter member of the Eastern League in 1938. The team was renamed the Williamsport Tigers and Williamsport Athletics in this period. The Grays played at Williamsport's Bowman Field from the park's opening in 1926.

Williamsport Grays, 1923-1946
The club was established in 1923 as a charter member of the New York–Pennsylvania League. The team was called the Williamsport Billies by the local media. Other names found in local papers included the Bald Eagles, Hinchmanites, and even the Bills, a name later adopted by the Eastern League clubs in the 1980s. The Billies played their games at Williamsport High School athletic fields, now on the campus of the Pennsylvania College of Technology.

The Billies were league champions in 1923 with a record of 82-42. The most prominent player was Mule Haas who would go on to play for the Philadelphia Athletics from 1929 to 1931.

The team changed its name to the Williamsport Grays for the 1925 season. In 1938, the New York-Pennsylvania League renamed itself the Eastern League and the Grays continued play in the league through 1946.

Williamsport Tigers, 1947-1952

From 1947–1949 and again in 1951–1952, The team was named the Williamsport Tigers were a AA affiliate of the Detroit Tigers. Detroit had a working relationship with Williamsport from 1946 until 1952.

Earle Halstead was a former American Association umpire and businessman from Dearborn, Michigan. Halstead gave up his business ventures in favor of owning the Williamsport team in 1945. Halstead arranged for the Williamsport franchise to have a working agreement with the Detroit Tigers of the American League.

The Tigers had been the 1945 World Series champions. Local fans were hopeful that the Tigers would fill the roster of the Williamsport team with better players that had previously been sent to Williamsport by the Washington Senators and Philadelphia A's. The Tigers took control of the franchise in 1947 and improved Bowman Field by spending $40,000 to repair flood damage and installing grandstand seats from Briggs Stadium in Detroit.

The Williamsport Grays changed their name to the Tigers for the 1947 season. This was their second year of affiliation with Detroit Tigers, and it was the first time that the Eastern League team in Williamsport was known as something other than the Grays. The 1947 club was managed by George Detore. The Tigers finished in 5th place of an eight team league with a record of 67 wins and 74 losses.

The 1948 season saw the Tigers have a change in manager with Gene Desautels taking over. The Tigers finished in fourth place in the Eastern League and reached a one-game playoff for the final spot in the league playoffs. The Tigers lost that game to the Hartford Chiefs. Lou Kretlow who would go on to play in the majors for the Tigers, St. Louis Browns, Baltimore Orioles, Chicago White Sox and the A's was named the league's Most Valuable Player.

The Tigers slipped back into mediocrity during the 1949, 1951 and 1952 seasons. Notable players and managers to pass through Williamsport during these years included, Jack Tighe, Schoolboy Rowe and Hall of Famer Jim Bunning.

The franchise was sold at the end of the 1952 season to five anonymous businessmen for $7,500. The Tigers era ended at the same time when the team was once again aligned with the Philadelphia A's and the Williamsport Grays name was restored.

Williamsport Athletics and Williamsport Grays, 1953-1962

In 1953, the club was referred to as the Williamsport A's or Williamsport Athletics a Class AA  affiliate of the Philadelphia Athletics. The Athletics names lasted for just the 1953 season. The franchise was purchased at the end of the 1952 season by five anonymous businessmen from the Detroit Tigers. The ownership group moved to establish a working arrangement with the Philadelphia A's owned by Connie Mack.

The Williamsport A's struggled on the field. They finished in sixth place with a record of 65 wins and 85 losses. The first African-Americans to play professional baseball in Williamsport were members of the squad. Joe Taylor a veteran of the Negro leagues and Héctor López who would go on to play in the majors with the A's and New York Yankees played the full season for the Williamsport A's.

The Williamsport Grays were the Philadelphia Phillies' minor league affiliate in the Eastern League from 1958 to 1962. On July 31, 1962, the Phillies traveled to Williamsport and lost to the Grays 4 to 1 at Bowman Field in a mid season exhibition game.

Year-by-year record

* Williamsport led Springfield Giants 1 game to 0 when rain hit.  Co-champions were declared

References

Defunct Eastern League (1938–present) teams
Defunct baseball teams in Pennsylvania
Grays
Cleveland Guardians minor league affiliates
Detroit Tigers minor league affiliates
Philadelphia Athletics minor league affiliates
Philadelphia Phillies minor league affiliates
Pittsburgh Pirates minor league affiliates
Washington Senators minor league affiliates
1923 establishments in Pennsylvania
1962 disestablishments in Pennsylvania
Baseball teams established in 1923
Baseball teams disestablished in 1962